Dean Hill (born October 26, 1986-September 5, 2021) was an Iroquois lacrosse player in the National Lacrosse League.

Professional career
Hill was selected in 2005 NLL Entry Draft by Minnesota Swarm. He came to Minnesota after a season in OJBLL on the team St. Catharines Spartans. Hill scored  80 points in 20 games and led the team in scoring. He also ranked 5th in the league in goals and 7th in scoring. In his second season in the league, he posted 32 goals and 53 points. Troubles with playing time led to his trade to the Rochester Knighthawks.

In 2009, he was traded again, this time to the Edmonton Rush.

International career
Dean Hill also took part in number of major international events as a member of Iroquois Nationals, including two World Indoor Lacrosse Championship in 2007 and 2011, where he and his team gained silver medals.

Statistics

References

External links
Stats at NLL.com

1986 births
Living people
Edmonton Rush players
Iroquois nations lacrosse players
Minnesota Swarm players
Georgia Swarm players
Washington Stealth players
Colorado Mammoth players
Native American sportspeople
Sportspeople from Scarborough, Toronto
Rochester Knighthawks players
First Nations sportspeople